Events from the year 1884 in Sweden

Incumbents
 Monarch – Oscar II
 Prime Minister – Carl Johan Thyselius, Robert Themptander

Events
 - The court case of the short story collection Getting Married by August Strindberg, one of the most known incidents of the ongoing so called Sedlighetsdebatten.
 - The women's organization Fredrika-Bremer-Förbundet is founded in Stockholm. It is followed by the woman's organisation Göteborgs Kvinnoförening in Gothenburg.  
 - May - Karolina Widerström becomes the first woman to graduate in medicine in Sweden.
 - First issue of ATL Lantbrukets Affärstidning
 - The toy company Brio is founded. 
 - First issue of Svenska Dagbladet
 - The nursing college Sophiahemmet University College is founded in Stockholm by the queen.
 - The appointment of the Workers' Insurance Committee
 Which led in turn to the 1889 Workers' Safety Act and the foundation of the Labor Inspectorate, as well as the 1891 National Health Insurance Act

Births

 29 January – Rickard Sandler, 20th prime minister (died 1964)
 9 March – Carl Holmberg, gymnast (died 1909).
 31 March – Axel Ljung, gymnast (died 1938).
 25 May – Gösta Lilliehöök, modern pentathlete (died 1974).
 4 July – Gustaf Malmström, wrestler (died 1970).

Deaths

 22 November - Wilhelmina Gravallius, writer (born 1809) 
 Carolina Granberg, ballerina (born 1818) 
 Lovisa Charlotta Borgman, violinist (born 1798)
 Therese Kamph, educational reformer (born 1836)

References

 
Years of the 19th century in Sweden